Aarne Emil Kreuzinger-Janik (born 13 April 1950, Lübeck, West Germany) is a German lieutenant general of the Bundeswehr. He was the commander of the Air Force Forces Command from 2006 to 2009, and, from 2009 to 2012, the 14th Inspector of the Air Force.

Military career 
Kreuzinger-Janik entered the Bundeswehr in 1969 and passed through the officer training and flight training as an aviation instructor for jet aircraft. From 1974 to 1981, he was a pilot of a Lockheed F-104 Starfighter, and a news officer and deployment officer at the Taktisches Luftwaffengeschwader 31 "Boelcke" in Nörvenich. After participating in the training as a general staff officer at the Führungsakademie der Bundeswehr in Hamburg from 1981 to 1983, he was there as a planning staff officer until 1985.

In 1985, Kreuzinger-Janik was transferred to Memmingen as the relay captain of the "Allgäu" unit of the Jagdbombergeschwader 34 squadron. In 1988, he served as deputy director in the A3 department of the 3rd Luftwaffe Division at Kalkar, and in 1989 as a study project officer at the Bundeswehr Office for Studies at Bergisch Gladbach. In 1990, he returned to Jagdbombergeschwader 34 as the commander. In 1992, he became a G3 staff officer at the NATO headquarters at SHAPE in Mons, Belgium.

His first ministerial use followed, from 1994 to 1996, on a referendum service for military policy bases in the Armed Forces Staff (Fü S) at the Federal Ministry of Defense in Bonn. During his time as a geschwaderkommodore of the Taktisches Luftwaffengeschwader 51 "Immelmann" in Jagel, and from 1996 to 1997, he was a commodore of the Einsatzgeschwaders 1 of the Bundeswehr contingency in Piacenza in Italy. After his term as Deputy Commander and General for National Territorial Duties in the Military Area II from 1999 to 2000, he returned to a service post in the Luftwaffe.

From 2000 to 2003, he was Chief of Staff in the Luftwaffe's leadership (Fü L III) in Bonn. In 2003, he took command of the 3rd Luftwaffe Division, headquartered in Gatow. On 1 June 2006, Kreuzinger-Janik became commander of the Air Force Forces Command in Cologne and the Luftwaffenkaserne Wahn, which he held until 26 October. On 29 October 2009 Karl-Theodor zu Guttenberg appointed as the German Minister of the Federal Ministry of Defence on the previous day, gave him the post of Inspector-General of the Luftwaffe. He was followed, as already in 2003, as a division commander by general lieutenant . In this role, he worked until his retirement. He handed over his services as inspector to his successor, general lieutenant Karl Müllner. Kreuzinger-Janik retired on 30 April 2012.

Kreuzinger-Janik has over 2,800 flight hours, especially on the F-104 and the Panavia Tornado.

Private life 
Kreuzinger-Janik is married and has two children.

Honors 
 2012: Order of Merit of the Federal Republic of Germany

See also 
 Rank insignia of the German Bundeswehr

References

External links 
 History of the Luftwaffe - General lieutenant Aarne Kreuzinger-Janik

1950 births
Living people
Lieutenant generals of the German Air Force
German Air Force pilots
Officers Crosses of the Order of Merit of the Federal Republic of Germany
Military personnel from Lübeck